Literaturnoye Kafe, or Literary Cafe, is a historically significant restaurant on Nevsky Prospect in Saint Petersburg, Russia, that was frequented by famous writers of Russian literature, including Alexander Pushkin and Fyodor Dostoyevsky, and their friends in the nineteenth century.

History
In 1812–14, the mid-18th-century building at 18 Nevsky Avenue in Saint Petersburg, the capital city of Russia at that time, was renovated by K. B. Kotomin as an apartment for merchants (Kotomin House). In this building S. Wolff & T. Beranget opened their confectionery, which was considered the best in St. Petersburg. In 1834, a Chinese café (Café chinois) was added. The confectionery soon became a place where writers of Russian literature, such as Alexander Pushkin, Mikhail Lermontov, Taras Shevchenko, and Fyodor Dostoyevsky, gathered.

In 1837, Pushkin, on the way to his fatal duel with George D'Antès, met his second, Konstantin Danzas, there. In 1840, Dostoyevsky was introduced to Mikhail Petrashevsky, the Utopian socialist, there.

In 1877, after the closure of the confectionery, a high-class restaurant was opened, which musicians such as Pyotr Tchaikovsky and Feodor Chaliapin frequently visited. Tchaikovsky is said to have ordered there a cup of water that turned out to be tainted with cholera, from which he died.

In 1858–2001, the basement of the building was converted into a used bookshop, which became relatively well known. In 1978–81, the
building was entirely renovated, and, in 1983, the restaurant reopened under the name of the Literaturnoye Kafe, or Literary Cafe.

At present
Literaturnoye Kafe occupies two floors of the building, with many pictures of Russian writers hanging on its walls. The traditional drink of Russia is not coffee, but black tea. Tea in a samovar can also be served.

See also
 Russian writers of the 19th century 
 Russian musicians of the 19th century
 Café Procope (Paris)
 Literary Salons in Russia

References

External links
 Official site

Buildings and structures in Saint Petersburg 
History of Saint Petersburg
Tourist attractions in Saint Petersburg
Russian literature
Restaurants in Russia